El Jaish SC is a Qatari professional basketball club. The club competes in the Qatari Basketball League.

The club has traditionally provided Qatar's national basketball team with key players.

Current roster

Notable players
 Mohd Mohamed
 Mohamed Youssef
 Anthony Anderson
 Devan Downey
 Sean Lampley
 Alex Legion
 Vernon Macklin

See also
El Jaish SC

References

External links
Asia-Basket.com Team Page

Basketball teams in Doha
Basketball teams established in 2007
El Jaish SC